The  2011 ISAF Sailing World Championships was held in Perth, Western Australia, this was the third edition of the ISAF Sailing World Championships. It is the world championships for all disciplines used at the upcoming Olympics. As it used to allocate 75% of the qualification quota for the 2012 Summer Olympics this event has added significance.

Venues
A number of different venues and courses was used for the different events:
 The Harbour Course. Women's match racing events – billed as "largest match racing competition ever held" – will be held in the Inner Harbour.
 The Centre Course, closest to the shore. Will host most medal races.
 The Leighton Course, located off of Leighton Beach in North Fremantle.
 The Parmelia Course, located west of the Centre Course, closest to Rottnest Island.
 The Owen Course. The most southerly course, closest to Woodman Point.
 The Success Course. Both the men's and women's Laser events will be held at the Fremantle Sailing Club in near Success Harbour, south of the main venues.

Festival
In conjunction with the sailing championships, a festival, the 2011 WORLDS FESTIVAL, will be held in Fremantle, featuring "an exciting and diverse programme of cultural activities that will showcase [the] Australian lifestyle, the sport of sailing and the arts".

Controversy
The City of Fremantle objected to the branding of the championships as a "Perth event", in particular, the erection of a large "Perth" sign on Bathers' Beach outside Challenger Harbour. Fremantle had previously hosted the 1987 America's Cup.

Opening ceremony
The opening ceremony of the championship was held on 2 December 2011 at the Barrack Street Jetty. The ceremony consisted of parade of athletes through the streets of Perth, speeches by dignitaries, oaths from competitors and officials, and the raising of the International Sailing Federation flag, followed by a parade of sail down the Swan River from Perth to Fremantle, featuring a "convoy of boats representing the history and heritage of each of the yacht clubs along the river".

Events and equipment
The following events were open for entries:

Summary

Medal table

Event medalists

References

External links

2011
 
Sports competitions in Perth, Western Australia
Sailing competitions in Western Australia
2011 in Australian sport
December 2011 sports events in Australia